Caprisongs (stylised in all caps) is the first mixtape by English singer-songwriter FKA Twigs. It was released on 14 January 2022 through Young and Atlantic Records. The mixtape features guest appearances from Pa Salieu, the Weeknd, Shygirl, Dystopia, Rema, Daniel Caesar, Jorja Smith, and Unknown T. The production is handled by el Guincho, who co-executive produced the mixtape alongside Twigs, as well as Arca, Cirkut, and Mike Dean, among others. The mixtape was supported by one single, "Tears in the Club", which features the Weeknd, and one promotional single, "Jealousy", which features Rema.

Background and promotion
In October 2020, FKA Twigs took part in a virtual chat on the Grammy Museum's Programs at Home series. During the chat, she revealed that she was "just finishing" a new album that she made largely in collaboration with el Guincho, and with other collaborators, many of whom she met for the first time via FaceTime calls. Later in November 2020, British singer Dua Lipa hosted a livestream concert, titled Studio 2054, in which Twigs was invited to play as a guest. The two teased an upcoming collaboration, titled "Why Don't You Love Me", during Twigs' performance.

On 25 January 2021, Twigs took part in a podcast episode with Louis Theroux and discussed her previous known relationships and an upcoming album, stating "It was all via the internet...I have more collaborations and features on this album than I ever had before." In February, she described the album as a "going out" record, and revealed it would feature collaborations with Nigerian Afrobeats star Rema, British hip-hop up-and-comer Pa Salieu. A few days later, Twigs, interviewed by British actress and screenwriter Michaela Coel, revealed that she had changed the undisclosed, original title of the upcoming record due to a well-known artist titling a non-musical project the same thing. In an interview with Vogue in May, Twigs revealed the album does not have a set release date, but wanted to release it in the northern summer of 2021.

Twigs joined the official FKA Twigs Discord server in September 2021, and shared details about the upcoming record. Twigs confirmed the project to be a mixtape, and listed el Guincho, Koreless, and Arca, as well as new collaborators, such as Cirkut, Mike Dean, as producers for the project. She additionally teased a collaboration with Swedish rapper Yung Lean on Instagram.

The lead single of the mixtape, "Tears in the Club", which features Canadian singer-songwriter the Weeknd, was released with a music video on 16 December 2021. The sole promotional single, "Jealousy", which features Nigerian singer Rema, was released on 13 January 2022, only one day prior to the release of the project. The mixtape marked her first release under Atlantic Records. The mixtape was officially announced on 7 January 2022, a week before the scheduled release date. Coinciding with the release of the mixtape on 14 January 2022, Twigs released a music video for "Ride the Dragon", which was a guerrilla dance video shot in Hackney, London. A number of other 'Caprivids' were released after this in the same style.

Composition
Caprisongs is seen as a departure from Twigs' previous work and a shift towards less experimental and more mainstream sound. It is described as a work of "visceral" art pop and "unbridled" avant-pop music. Its lyrics are influenced by R&B and hip hop, while its beats are influenced by trap, drum'n'bass, and dancehall. "Darjeeling" features "a skittering harp" which "becomes the basis for a banging grime beat". "Pamplemousse" is a hyperpop song that recalls Charli XCX and Sophie, while "Jealousy" contains elements of Afrobeats. The album features spoken word interludes from Twigs' friends and collaborators, and one  featuring a fan ask about her unreleased Dua Lipa duet, "Why Don't You Love Me?"

Critical reception

Caprisongs was met with critical acclaim from music critics. At Metacritic, which assigns a normalized rating out of 100 to reviews from professional publications, the album received an average score of 80, based on 17 reviews. Aggregator AnyDecentMusic? gave it 7.7 out of 10, based on their assessment of the critical consensus.

Helen Brown for The Independent called the mixtape "an often exquisitely crafted sequence of grooves" that's "elegantly laced together by [T]wigs's sad angel voice". Julyssa Lopez of Rolling Stone wrote, "The rawness of her previous work is part of what makes the unbridled avant pop on her new mixtape, Caprisongs, such an epic thrill. [...] Throughout her career, Twigs has morphed R&B wisps and electronic abstractions into highly visual concept art, and although the music on Caprisongs is her most buoyant, she doesn't sacrifice her creative nonconformity or intimacy." David Smyth of Evening Standard stated that "the tone on Caprisongs is predominantly bright and relaxed" and eventually concluded that, even though "she's closer to the mainstream pop world than ever before here", "it doesn't sound like a compromise. There's still plenty of sonic weirdness in the corners, and she's surely earned some time in the sun." Cat Zhang of Pitchfork thought the mixtape is a "playful and adventurous flex", writing that Caprisongs is the "sound of [T]wigs in the driver's seat as she traverses her own curiosities and instincts; [...] It is intrepid and light, the image of a woman attuned to planetary alignments but casting her own fate." Heather Phares from AllMusic claimed that, "Though Caprisongs nods to more mainstream sounds than her previous work, Barnett can still make any trend or genre her own."

LaTesha Harris of NPR called the mixtape a "[t]riumphant and external [...] milestone of significant personal and professional transformation", but criticized the vocal manipulation as "too robotic", "specifically on 'Minds of Men' and 'Pamplemousse', [which sound] as if Amazon's Alexa downloaded poetry software and delivered the result on loop." Alex Rigotti of Clash highlighted the influence of Björk's 2001 album Vespertine, "whose microbeats, plucky harps and music boxes are scattered over various tracks", concluding that, "[w]hilst it's nice to hear a change of pace for [T]wigs (and to, on occasion, genuinely hear her laugh), there's not as much focus on experimentation and expression, which could disappoint some exacting fans." Alexis Petridis of The Guardian opined, "There's a lot that's laudable about Caprisongs. [...] But equally, it's something that ultimately impedes your enjoyment of the album. As a soundtrack for the start of a night, it doesn't quite pan out as you might hope."

Track listing

Notes
 signifies a co-producer
 signifies an additional producer
 signifies a drum producer
All tracks are stylised in all lowercase.

Sample credits
 "Tears in the Club" interpolates a section of "@@@@@", known as "Phantasy", composed and performed by Arca.
 "Darjeeling" interpolates the song  "You're Not Alone" (1996), composed by Tim Kellett and Robin Taylor-Firth, and performed by Olive.

Personnel

Musicians

 Rob Moose – strings (track 3)
 Kash Powell – additional vocals (track 3), vocals (track 14)
 Roxy Lee – additional vocals (track 3), vocals (track 14)
 Lous & The Yakuza – background vocals (track 5)
 Jemma Mayo – background vocals (track 5)
 Abigail Sakari – background vocals (track 5)
 Suzannah Pettigrew – background vocals (track 5)
 Sara El Dabi – background vocals (track 5)
 Alejandra Luisa Smits – background vocals (track 5)
 Matthew Healy – additional vocals (track 6)
 Louis – additional vocals (track 6)
 Kaner Flex – additional vocals (track 9)
 Movie Star Johnny – additional vocals (track 9)
 Dystopia – additional vocals (track 9)
 Tolani – vocals (track 14)
 Shoneye – vocals (track 14)
 Irene Agbontean – vocals (track 14)
 Christi Meshell – vocals (track 16)

Technical

 FKA Twigs – executive production
 El Guincho – executive production
 Jonny Leslie – engineering
 Joe LaPorta – mastering
 Mike Dean – mastering, mixing (tracks 1–3, 6–8, 10–17)
 Serban Ghenea – mixing (track 4)
 Bryce Bordone – engineering (track 4)
 Jaycen Joshua – mixing (tracks 5, 9)
 Jacob Richards – mixing assistance (tracks 5, 9)
 Mike Seaberg – mixing assistance (tracks 5, 9)
 DJ Riggins – mixing assistance (tracks 5, 9)

Charts

References

2022 mixtape albums
Albums produced by Arca (musician)
Albums produced by Cirkut
Albums produced by el Guincho
Albums produced by Mike Dean (record producer)
Atlantic Records albums
Debut mixtape albums
FKA Twigs albums